Chris Sagramola (born 25 February 1988) is a Luxembourgian footballer.  He plays as striker for the Luxembourg national team and for domestic club side UN Käerjéng 97.

Club career
Raised at Jeunesse, Sagramola made his debut for the senior team in the 2004/2005 season. In early 2007, he went on trial at Swiss team FC Thun.
He was as well in the Serie B Footballclub of Rimini Calcio, after he had a try for the 1.FC Nürnberg in Germany.

International career
Sagramola made his debut for Luxembourg in a September 2005 World Cup qualification match against Portugal. As of July 2008, he has earned 8 caps, scoring 2 goals. He played in 2 FIFA World Cup qualification matches.

Sagramola's late winner for the national side against Gambia in February 2007 secured Luxembourg's first international victory in almost twelve years.

International goals
Scores and results list Luxembourg's goal tally first.

References

External links
 
 

1988 births
Living people
Luxembourgian footballers
Jeunesse Esch players
Luxembourg international footballers
UN Käerjéng 97 players
Association football forwards